Amy-Eloise Markovc (née Neale; born 5 August 1995) is a British long-distance runner based in the United States. She competes in cross country running and track events. In March 2021, Markovc won European Athletics Indoor Championships 3000 m in a personal best time 8:46.43. She is married to Jernej Markovc who competed as a rower for the Slovenian National Team and University of Washington.

Career
Born in Stockport, England, she later moved to the United States and took up track and field. At the age of 14 she won the 2000 metres steeplechase at the 2010 USATF National Junior Olympic Track & Field Championships. While studying at Glacier Peak High School, Neale was the Washington state Gatorade Girls Track & Field Athlete of the Year for three years running (2011, 2012, 2013). Neale had top eight finishes each year at the Nike Cross Nationals from 2010 to 2012, with her highest finish being 3rd in 2010.

Her international debut for Great Britain followed at the 2011 World Youth Championships in Athletics, where she placed eleventh in the steeplechase final. Markovc competed in her first major cross country running event at the 2013 IAAF World Cross Country Championships, placing 21st in the junior race. She was also a steeplechase finalist at the 2013 European Athletics Junior Championships and 2014 World Junior Championships in Athletics. After the latter event she did not compete for 18 months.

In 2016 she began to compete again for the Washington Huskies track team for her alma mater, the University of Washington. She won both the Pac-12 Cross Country Championship and NCAA Women's Division I West Regional Cross Country Championship, then took eighth place at the NCAA Women's Division I Cross Country Championship. Markovc made the final in the mile at the 2017 NCAA Division I Indoor Track and Field Championships. In the 2017 outdoor track season, she was runner-up in the 5000m at the Pac-12 Track and Field Championships, and made the 1500 metres final at the NCAA Women's Division I Outdoor Track and Field Championships.

It was in cross country that she began to make an impact in 2017, becoming the runner-up at the NCAA Women's Division I Cross Country Championship and third in the Pac-12 Conference meet. She then placed fourth for Great Britain in the under-23 race at the 2017 European Cross Country Championships where she shared in the U23 team title. Her focus returned to the track in 2018, with highlights including fifth in the 5000 metres at the NCAA Outdoor Championships and twelfth in the 3000 metres at the NCAA Indoor Championships. In the 2018 season, she set the University of Washington school record in the 5000m (15:24.16). Despite running the fourth fastest 5000m in Great Britain in 2018, she only placed ninth in the 5000 m final at 2018 British Athletics Championships,

Later in 2018, Markovc signed with the Reebok Boston Track Club under coach Chris Fox. In 2019, she secured her first national podium at the 2019 British Indoor Athletics Championships with third in the 3000 metres.

In February 2021, Markovc broke the British 2 mile record at New Balance Indoor Grand Prix in New York, completing the distance in 9:30.69. In March 2021, Markovc won European Athletics Indoor Championships 3000 m in a personal best time 8:46.43.
In June 2022, Markovc set a personal best in the Diamond League meet at Rabat in the 3000 m with a 8:40:32.

International competitions

References

External links
 
 Amy-Eloise Neale at University of Washington
 
 

Living people
1995 births
Sportspeople from Stockport
English female long-distance runners
English female middle-distance runners
English female cross country runners
English female steeplechase runners
British female long-distance runners
British female middle-distance runners
British female cross country runners
British female steeplechase runners
Track and field athletes from Washington (state)
Washington Huskies women's track and field athletes
European Athletics Indoor Championships winners
Athletes (track and field) at the 2020 Summer Olympics
Olympic athletes of Great Britain